Francis Drexel may refer to:

 Francis Anthony Drexel (1824–1885), Philadelphia banker
 Francis Martin Drexel (1792–1863), Philadelphia banker and artist